The evolution of bitter taste receptors has been one of the most dynamic evolutionary adaptations to arise in multiple species. This phenomenon has been widely studied in the field of evolutionary biology because of its role in the identification of toxins often found on the leaves of inedible plants. A palate more sensitive to these bitter tastes would, theoretically, have an advantage over members of the population less sensitive to these poisonous substances because they would be much less likely to ingest toxic plants. Bitter-taste genes have been found in a variety of species, and the same genes have been well characterized in several common laboratory animals such as primates and mice, as well as in humans. The primary gene responsible for encoding this ability in humans is the TAS2R gene family which contains 25 functional loci as well as 11 pseudogenes. The development of this gene has been well characterized, with proof that the ability evolved before the human migration out of Africa. The gene continues to evolve in the present day.

TAS2R 
The bitter taste receptor family, T2R (TAS2R), is encoded on chromosome 7 and chromosome 12. Genes on the same chromosome have shown remarkable similarity with each other, suggesting that the primary mutagenic forces in evolution of TAS2R are duplication events. These events have occurred in at least seven primate species: chimpanzee, human, gorilla, orangutan, rhesus macaque and baboon. The high variety among primate and rodent populations additionally suggests that, while selective constraint on these genes certainly exists, its effect is rather slight.

Members of the T2R family encode alpha subunits of G-protein-coupled receptors, which are involved in intracellular taste transduction, not only on the taste buds but also in the pancreas and gastrointestinal tract. The mechanism of transduction is shown by exposure of the endocrine and gastrointestinal cells containing the receptors to bitter compounds, most famously phenylthiocarbamide (PTC). Exposure to PTC causes an intracellular cascade as evidenced by a large and rapid increase in intracellular calcium ions.

Toxins as the primary selective force 
The primary selective adaptation that arises from bitter taste is to detect poisonous compounds, as most poisonous compounds in nature are bitter. However, this trait is not exclusively positive, as bitter compounds exist in nature that are not poisonous. Exclusive rejection of these compounds would in fact be a negative trait, as it would make it more difficult to find food. Toxic and bitter compounds do, however, exist in different diets at different frequencies. Sensitivities to bitter compounds should follow the requirements of different diets logically, as species that can afford to reject plants due to their low plant diet (carnivores) have a higher sensitivity to bitter compounds than those that exclusively ingest plants. Exposure to the bitter marker quinine hydrochloride supported this fact, as the sensitivities to bitter compounds were highest in carnivores, followed by omnivores, then grazers and browsers. This identifies toxic plants as the primary selective force for bitter taste.

This phenomenon is confirmed with genetic analysis. One measure of positive selection is Ka/Ks, the ratio of synonymous to non-synonymous mutations. If the rate of synonymous mutation is higher than the rate of non-synonymous mutation, then the trait created by the non-synonymous mutation is being selected for relative to the neutral synonymous mutations. For the bitter taste gene family, TAS2R, this ratio is over one in the loci responsible for the extracellular binding domains of the receptors. This indicates that the part of the receptor responsible for binding the bitter ligands is under positive selective pressure.

TAS2R development in human history 
The pseudogenes mentioned earlier are produced by a number of gene silencing events, the rate of which is constant throughout primate species. Several of these pseudogenes maintain a role in modulating taste response, however. By studying the silencing events in humans, it is possible to theorize the selective pressures on humans throughout their evolutionary history. As is the case with the usual distribution of human genetic variation, the highest rate of diversity in TAS2R pseudogenes was often found in African populations. This was not the case with two pseudogene loci: TAS2R6P and TAS2R18P, where the highest diversity was found in non-African populations. This suggests that the functional versions of these genes arose before the human migration out of Africa into an area where selective constraint did not remove non-functional versions of these gene loci. This allowed the pseudogene frequency to increase, creating genetic variance at those loci. This is an example of relaxed environmental constraint allowing silencing mutations to lead to pseudogenization of once important loci.

The gene locus, TAS2R16, also tells a story about bitter taste evolution. Varying rates of positive selection in different areas of the world give an indication of the selective pressures and events in those areas. At this locus, the 172Asn allele is the most common, especially in areas of Eurasia and in pygmy tribes in Africa, where it is nearly fixed. This suggests that the gene has had a relaxed selective constraint in most areas of Africa in comparison to Eurasia. This has been attributed to the increased knowledge of toxic plants in the area that arose around 10,000 years ago. The increased frequency of 172Asn in Eurasia suggests that the migration out of Africa into areas with different climates and foliage rendered the knowledge of toxic plants in Africa useless, forcing the populations to rely once again on the 172Asn allele, causing higher rates of positive selection. The high rate of 172Asn in Pygmy populations is more difficult to explain. The effective population size of these isolated populations is quite small, indicating that genetic drift explained by the founder effect is the cause of these atypically high rates. The different environments that have contained humans have placed different levels of selection on the population, forcing a wide variety in at the TAS2R loci across humanity.

Relaxed constraint 
Neutral evolution in the bitter taste trait in humans is well documented by evolutionary biologists. In all human populations there have been high rates of synonymous and non-synonymous substitutions that cause pseudogenization. These events cause alleles that are present to this day because of relaxed selective constraint by the environment. The genes under neutral evolution in humans are very similar to several genes in chimpanzees in both their synonymous and non-synonymous mutation rates, suggesting that relaxed selective constraint started before the divergence of the two species.

The cause of this relaxed constraint was primarily in lifestyle changes in hominids. Roughly two million years ago, the hominid diet shifted from a primarily vegetarian diet to an increasingly meat-based diet. This led to a reduction in the amount of toxic foods regularly encountered by humanity's early ancestors. Additionally, the use of fire began around 800,000 years ago, which further detoxified food and led to a decreased dependence on TAS2R to detect poisonous food. Evolutionary biologists have theorized how, with fire being an exclusively human tool, relaxed selective constraint has been found in chimpanzees as well. Meat does account for about 15% of the chimpanzee diet, with much of the other 85% being made up of ripe fruits, which very rarely contains toxins. This comes in contrast to other primates whose diets are entirely composed of leaves, unripe fruits, and bark, which have comparatively high levels of toxins. The differences in diets between chimpanzees and other primates accounts for the different levels of selective constraint.

References

Sensory receptors
Evolution by phenotype